The higher region of the Alps were long left to the exclusive attention of the inhabitants of the adjoining valleys, even when Alpine travellers (as distinguished from Alpine climbers) began to visit these valleys. It is reckoned that about 20 glacier passes were certainly known before 1600, about 25 more before 1700, and yet another 20 before 1800. Even though the attempt of P.A. Arnod, an official of the duchy of Aosta, in 1689 to "re-open" the Col du Ceant may be counted as having been made by a non-native, historical records do not show any further such activities until the last quarter of the 18th century. Nor did it fare much better with the high peaks, though the two earliest recorded ascents were due to non-natives, that of the Rocciamelone in 1358 having been undertaken in fulfilment of a vow, and that of the Mont Aiguille in 1492 by order of Charles VIII of France, in order to destroy its immense reputation for inaccessibility – in 1555 Conrad Gesner did not climb Pilatus proper, but only the grassy mound of the Gnepfstein, the lowest and the most westerly of the seven summits.

Early 19th century 
The first men who really systematically explored the regions of ice and snow were Horace-Bénédict de Saussure (1740–1799), as regards the Pennine Alps, and the Benedictine monk of Disentis, Placidus a Spescha (1752–1833), in the valleys at the sources of the Rhine. In the early 19th century the Meyer family of Aarau conquered in person the Jungfrau (1811) and by deputy the Finsteraarhorn (1812), along with opening several glacier passes. Their energy was entirely confined to the Bernese Oberland. Their pioneer work was continued in that district, as well as others, by a number of Swiss, pre-eminent among whom were Gottlieb Samuel Studer (1804–1890) of Bern and Edouard Desor (1811–1882) of Neuchâtel. The first-known English climber in the Alps was Colonel Mark Beaufoy (1764–1827), who in 1787 made an ascent (the fourth) of Mont Blanc. This was a mountain to which his fellow-countrymen long exclusively devoted themselves, with a few noteworthy exceptions such as Principal J.D. Forbes (1809–1868), A. T. Malkin (1803–1888), John Ball (1818–1889), and Sir Alfred Wills (1828–1912).

In the Eastern Alps the serious exploration began with the first ascent of the Großglockner in 1800, initiated by Franz-Xaver Salm-Raifferscheid, archbishop of Gurk. Around Monte Rosa, the Vincent family, Josef Zumstein (1783–1861), and Giovanni Gnifetti (1801–1867) did good work during the half century between 1778 and 1842, while in the Eastern Alps the Archduke John (1782–1850), Prince F. J. C. von Schwarzenberg, archbishop of Salzburg (1809–1885), Valentine Stanig (1774–1847), Adolf Schaubach (1800–1850), above all, P.J. Thurwieser (1789–1865), deserve to be recalled as pioneers in the first half of the 19th century.

Late 19th century 
In the early fifties of the 19th century the taste for mountaineering rapidly developed as a great stimulus was given to it by the foundation of the various Alpine clubs, each of which drew together the climbers who dwelt in the same country. The first was the English Alpine Club (founded in the winter of 1857–1858), followed in 1862 by the Austrian Alpine Club (which in 1873 was fused, under the name of the German and Austrian Alpine Club, with the German Alpine Club, founded in 1869), in 1863 by the Italian and Swiss Alpine Club, and in 1874 by the French Alpine Club, not to mention numerous minor societies of more local character. It was by the members of these clubs and societies that the minute exploration of the High Alps was carried out, as well much in the way of building club huts, organizing and training guides etc, to smooth the way for later comers who would benefit by the detailed information published in the periodicals issued by these clubs.

First ascents of major peaks 
The following two sub-joined lists give the dates of the first ascent of the greater peaks. apart from the two climbed in 1358 and in 1402 (see above).

Before 1858 
 1100 Untersberg
 1358 Rocciamelone
 1579 Serles
 1610 Schesaplana
 1739 or 1744 Titlis
 1762 Ankogel
 1778 Triglav
 1779 Mont Velan
 1782 Sulzfluh
 1784 Dents du Midi
 1786 Mont Blanc
 1789 Rheinwaldhorn
 1795 Großes Wiesbachhorn
 1800 Großglockner
 1801 Punta Giordani
 1804 Ortler
 1811 Jungfrau
 1813 Breithorn
 1819 Piramide Vincent
 1820 Zugspitze, Zumsteinspitze
 1824 Tödi
 1828 Kitzsteinhorn, Mont Pelvoux
 1829 (or 1812?) Finsteraarhorn
 1830 Schalfkogel
 1832 Hochvogel, Hoher Dachstein
 1833 Strahlkogel
 1835 Piz Linard, Piz Palü
 ~1840 Hoher Tenn, Schrankogel
 1841 Großvenediger
 1842 Lauteraarhorn, Punta Gnifetti
 1843 Großer Löffler, Wildhorn
 1844 Johannisberg, Wetterhorn
 1845 Galenstock
 1846 Piz Kesch
 1848 Wildspitze, Zimba
 1850 Diablerets, Piz Bernina
 1853 Glockturm, Hohe Geige
 1854 Hochgall, Königspitze, Rötspitze, Strahlhorn
 1854 or 1855 Mont Blanc du Tacul
 1855 Hochalmspitze, Dufourspitze (Monte Rosa), Weissmies
 1856 Aiguille du Midi, Allalinhorn, Lagginhorn, Mönch, :de:Reichenspitze
 1857 Monte Pelmo, Piz Calderas, Uia di Ciamarella

1858-present 
 Dom, Eiger, Nadelhorn, Piz Morteratsch, Wildstrubel (1858)
 Aletschhorn, Bietschhorn, Grand Combin, Grivola, Rimpfischhorn (1859)
 Alphubel, Blüemlisalphorn, Gran Paradiso, Grande Casse (1860)
 Castor, Lyskamm, Monte Viso, Schreckhorn, Weisshorn, Weißkugel (1861)
 Dent Blanche, Gross Fiescherhorn, Monte Disgrazia, Täschhorn (1862)
 Dent d'Hérens, Parrotspitze, Piz Zupò (1863)
 Aiguille d'Argentière, Balmhorn, Barre des Écrins, Marmolata, Mont Dolent, Pollux, Presanella, Zinalrothorn (1864)
 Aiguille Verte, Grand Cornier, Matterhorn, Ober Gabelhorn, Piz Roseg, Tschingelhorn (1865)
 Piz Cengalo (1866)
 Piz Palü (1866/1868)
 Civetta, Piz Badile (1867)
 Bellavista, Grandes Jorasses (1868)
 Hohberghorn, Langkofel (1869)
 Ailefroide, Cimon della Pala, Lenzspitze (1870)
 Portjengrat, Aiguille du Plan (1871)
 Pierre Menue, Levanna Centrale (1875)
 Les Droites, Mont Collon (1876)
 Meije, Mont Blanc de Courmayeur, Piz Scerscen, Pic Coolidge (1877)
 Aiguille du Dru, Les Bans, Mont Maudit (1878)
 Dürrenhorn (1879)
 Aiguille des Grands Charmoz, Olan (1880)
 Aiguille du Grépon (1881)
 Dent du Géant (1882)
 Bishorn (1884)
 Aiguille Blanche de Peuterey (1885)
 Stecknadelhorn (1887)
 Fletschhorn (1889)
 Aiguille Dibona (1913)

See also 

Golden age of alpinism
History of the Alps
Silver age of alpinism
A detailed list of first ascents, including over a hundred mountains in the Alps
List of mountains of the Alps, all 1500+ peaks with >300 m prominence, most with first ascent years

References 

History of the Alps
History of mountaineering
Exploration of Europe